Obesity is a monthly peer-reviewed medical journal covering research into obesity. It was established in 1993 under the name Obesity Research, obtaining its current name in 2006. It is published by Wiley-Blackwell on behalf of the Obesity Society, of which it is the official journal. The editor-in-chief is Eric Ravussin (Pennington Biomedical Research Center). According to the Journal Citation Reports, the journal has a 2020 impact factor of 5.002.

References

External links

Monthly journals
Academic journals associated with learned and professional societies
Obesity journals
Wiley-Blackwell academic journals
Publications established in 1993
English-language journals